Hulkbuster may refer to:
 The Hulkbuster armor, a fictional suit of armor worn by the Marvel Comics superhero Iron Man to counter the Hulk
 The Hulkbusters, a number of fictional organizations formed to combat the Hulk